The untitled Lewis Hamilton project is an upcoming documentary film about the British Formula One World Champion, Lewis Hamilton. The film will be directed by Matt Kay, and released on Apple TV+.

Production
On March 9, 2022, it was announced that Apple TV+ had brought the rights to a feature documentary about the life and career of the British Formula One World Champion, Lewis Hamilton.

The film will be produced by Hamilton and Penni Thow, and executive produced by Richard Plepler through Eden Productions, and Scott Budnick through One Community. Box to Box Films is also attached as a production company.

References

External links
 

American auto racing films
American sports documentary films
Apple TV+ original films
Documentary films about auto racing